Ariane, jeune fille russe is a 1931 French-German drama film directed by Paul Czinner and starring Gaby Morlay, Rachel Devirys and Maria Fromet. It was a French-language version of the film Ariane made a co-production. It was adapted from the 1920 novel Ariane, jeune fille russe by Claude Anet.

Premise
Ariane, a Russian student in Paris, decides to seduce a man who is in his forties.

Cast

References

External links

Ariane, jeune fille russe

1931 films
1930s French-language films
Films directed by Paul Czinner
1931 drama films
French drama films
German drama films
Films based on French novels
Films based on romance novels
French multilingual films
German multilingual films
French black-and-white films
German black-and-white films
Films with screenplays by Paul Czinner
1931 multilingual films
1932 drama films
1932 films
1930s French films
1930s German films
French-language German films